Get Wet was a 1980s pop group, featuring lead singer Sherri Beachfront (born Sherri Lewis, April 12, 1954). They had one hit in America in 1981 with the Boardwalk/Columbia single "Just So Lonely", which peaked at #39 on the Billboard Hot 100. In Australia, it peaked at #15 on the Australian Singles Chart (Kent Music Report). The group appeared on popular shows of the day, including The Merv Griffin Show, Solid Gold, American Bandstand and Musikladen in the summer of 1981.

References

American pop music groups